An Enchanted Life is a Singaporean Chinese drama that was telecast on Singapore's free-to-air channel, MediaCorp TV Channel 8. This show made its debut on 9 October 2006 and made ended its run on 1 December 2006. The show consists of a total of 20 episodes. The theme song of the show is Hui Gu Niang.

Cast

Main cast
Yvonne Lim as Li Shan Qi
Pierre Png as Yang Zhi Yun
Fiona Xie as Zhang Mei Ya
Adam Chen as Xiao Fei

Supporting Cast
Bryan Wang as Chen Shu Tang
Chen Shucheng as Zhang Ming Sheng
Jin Yin Ji as Chen Yu Chun
Hong Hui Fang as Liu Yu Han
Ong Ai Leng as Ai Xi

Synopsis
Li Shanqi, a betel nut seller, had to flee Taiwan after offending an underworld leader. With her late mother's belongings, she came to Singapore to look for her birth father who is a jewelry businessman. When she arrives, an unfortunate string of events took place before she finally reunites with him.

However, further trial and tribulations await Shanqi as her stepmother and stepsister make things difficult for her. Undaunted, Shanqi upgrades herself and excel as a jewelry designer. She even caught the eye of the man her stepsister, Meiya, fancies. As a proud Meiya turns mad with hatred and jealousy, will Shanqi's sweet turn of events be ruined by her? Will fate bring her and the man she loves together?

Viewership
An average of 750,000 people watched this show every day during its telecast. On the last episode, a total of about 860,000 people watched the show. This drama series ranked 7th in terms of highest viewership ratings for the whole year.

See also
List of programmes broadcast by Mediacorp Channel 8

External links
An Enchanted Life Theme Song
An Enchanted Life (English)
An Enchanted Life (Chinese)

Singapore Chinese dramas
2006 Singaporean television series debuts
2006 Singaporean television series endings
Channel 8 (Singapore) original programming